Kermit Blount (born May 16, 1958) is an American football coach. He served as the head football coach at Winston-Salem State University from 1993 to 2009, Delaware State University from  2011 to 2014 and at Johnson C. Smith University in Charlotte, North Carolina from 2015 to 2021. He is a Winston-Salem State alumnus who played quarterback for the Rams from 1976 to 1979, and was a teammate of future National Football League (NFL) player Timmy Newsome.

During his tenure as head coach at his alma mater, the  Rams won two Central Intercollegiate Athletic Association (CIAA) titles, in 1999 and 2000. Blount's teams also appeared in the post-season Pioneer Bowl in 1999 and 2000. He compiled a record of 91–87–3, making him currently the winningest coach in the history of the Winston-Salem State football program.  He was responsible to helping former Ram football players such as Richard Huntley, Oronde Gadsden, Tory Woodbury, and William Hayes reach the NFL as either late round draft picks or free agents.

After resigning as head coach after the 2009 season, Blount worked as a special assistant to the athletic director at Winston-Salem State. The Rams football team was competing as a former transitional Division I-AA (now FCS) independent team, as Winston-Salem State's athletic program was planning to move up to the Mideastern Athletic Conference (MEAC) starting in 2006, but later decided to move back to NCAA Division II and back to the CIAA for the 2010–11 athletic season.

Blount was named the coach at Delaware State on February 3, 2011. Following the 2021 season, Blount's contract at Johnson C. Smith was not renewed.

Head coaching record

References

External links
 Johnson C. Smith profile

1958 births
Living people
American football quarterbacks
Delaware State Hornets football coaches
Johnson C. Smith Golden Bulls football coaches
Winston-Salem State Rams football coaches
Winston-Salem State Rams football players
Coaches of American football from Virginia
Players of American football from Richmond, Virginia
African-American coaches of American football
African-American players of American football
20th-century African-American sportspeople
21st-century African-American sportspeople